The M'Par or Mpar is a breed of small horse from the historic region of Cayor in Senegal, in West Africa. It is the smallest of the four Senegalese horse breeds, the others being the M'Bayar, the Fleuve and the Foutanké.

History 

The origins of the horse in Senegal are not documented. According to some authors, including Georges Doutressoulle, the M'Par may be an autochthonous breed with ancient origins in the area; others such as René Larrat see the horses of Senegal as descendants of Barb horses from the Maghreb countries to the north.

In 1996, Senegal had a horse population of about 400,000 head, the largest of any West African country. This was a substantial increase from the 216,000 reported in 1978, and a much greater increase from the population after the Second World War, estimated at barely 30,000. Population numbers for the M'Par are not reported. In 2007 the FAO did not have data from which to estimate the conservation status of the M'Par breed. 

The M'Par is gradually being assimilated into the much larger M'Bayar population, and is at risk of extinction.

Characteristics 

The M'Par is a small horse or pony. It is generally of poor conformation, heavy-headed, too long in the back, thin-legged, flat-chested and often with defective conformation of the legs. In compensation for these defects, it has exceptional qualities of endurance and rusticity.

Use 

Horses play an important part in the social and economic life in Senegal. The M'Par is used as a light draught horse. Because of its small size it is able to pull only light carts and fiacres.

References

Horse breeds
Horse breeds originating in Senegal